This Is Sanlitun is a 2013 comedy film directed by Róbert Ingi Douglas and starring Carlos Ottery. It is a co-production between China, Iceland and Ireland. It was screened in the Contemporary World Cinema section at the 2013 Toronto International Film Festival.

Plot
The film is a mockumentary about Gary, a British man, arriving in Beijing to set up a business and reconnect with his ex-wife.

Cast
 Carlos Ottery as Gary
 Christopher Loton as Frank
 Ai Wan as Lin
 Cromwell Cheung as Wang Ke
 David Kenneth Vaughan as Jonathan Taylor-Sharpe

References

External links
 

2013 films
2010s mockumentary films
Chinese comedy films
Irish comedy films
English-language Icelandic films
English-language Irish films
English-language Chinese films
Films set in Beijing
Expatriates
Icelandic comedy films
2013 comedy films
2010s English-language films
2010s Mandarin-language films